Collanges is a commune in the Puy-de-Dôme department in Auvergne-Rhône-Alpes in central France. It is in the canton of Brassac-les-Mines.

History
The historical development of the site and the region from medieval times were directly linked to the evolution of the families of the Lords of Collanges and the establishment of the Château de Collanges (castle of Collanges). Therefore since the occupations of WW2 the village and territory went under reconstruction until current days. Today Collanges presents modern transportation and communication while preserving its heritage of a historical site of France in the European Community.

See also
Communes of the Puy-de-Dôme department

References

Communes of Puy-de-Dôme